Ramón Osni Moreira Lage (born 24 May 1988), or simply Ramón, is a Brazilian former football attacking midfielder.

Career
Ramon started his professional career with Atlético Mineiro, before moving to Corinthians in 2006. In Brazil, many used to compare his playing style to that of Kaká. In 2007, Ramon moved to CSKA Moscow, despite being targeted by Arsenal and A.C. Milan, according to some rumours. Ramon scored one goal for CSKA against their fierce rivals Spartak Moscow in the final of the First Channel Cup, an annual exhibition tournament held in Israel. CSKA went on to beat Spartak 3-2. Ramon scored his first league goal for CSKA in the Russian Premier League second-round derby against Lokomotiv Moscow in March 2007.

On August 2009 he was loaned to Krylya Sovetov.

In December 2010 CSKA president Evgenii Giner said: "I think Ramon has finished with football. He is a talented footballer, but the ones like him finish standing by the beer stand bragging about past glories."

Honours
Brazil (u-17 team)
South American Under-17 Football Championship: 2005
FIFA U-17 World Championship runner-up: 2005

CSKA Moscow
Russian Super Cup: 2007, 2009
Russian Premier League runner-up: 2008

References

External links

1988 births
Sportspeople from Minas Gerais
Living people
Brazilian footballers
Association football midfielders
Clube Atlético Mineiro players
Sport Club Corinthians Paulista players
PFC CSKA Moscow players
PFC Krylia Sovetov Samara players
CR Flamengo footballers
Esporte Clube Bahia players
Clube Náutico Capibaribe players
Hokkaido Consadole Sapporo players
Clube do Remo players
Brasiliense Futebol Clube players
Goianésia Esporte Clube players
Araxá Esporte Clube players
Democrata Futebol Clube players
Esporte Clube Rio Verde players
Esporte Clube Democrata players
Campeonato Brasileiro Série A players
Russian Premier League players
Campeonato Pernambucano players
J1 League players
Campeonato Brasileiro Série D players
Brazilian expatriate footballers
Expatriate footballers in Russia
Brazilian expatriate sportspeople in Russia
Expatriate footballers in Japan
Brazilian expatriate sportspeople in Japan